Clik! is the fifth album by the London-based acid jazz band Corduroy. It was released on Big Cat Records in 1999.

The album featured a sound that was influenced by drum and bass and was produced by Rob Playford. The track "Moshi Moshi" was released as a single and appeared in the soundtrack (closing credits) of the 2002 film Ted Bundy.

Track listing

Personnel 
 Ben Addison – vocals, drums, arrangements
 Scott Addison – vocals, keyboards, arrangements
 Simon Nelson-Smith – guitars, sitar, arrangements
 Richard Searle – bass guitar, arrangements
 Angie Brown – vocals
 Billie Godfrey – vocals
 Wendi Batt – vocals
 Vicky Richardson – vocals
 Carrie Grant – vocals

References 

1999 albums
Corduroy (band) albums
Big Cat Records albums